Spiral is a studio album by Japanese jazz pianist Hiromi Uehara with bassist Tony Grey and drummer Martin Valihora. NPR called the album "part classical, part jazz and part simply unclassifiable."

Reception
Matt Cibula of PopMatters wrote, "Spiral is her third album... This record will be on many people's year-end lists, even if they are not jazz people. Dig it." Paula Edelstein of AllMusic commented, "With the release of Spiral, the award-winning pianist/composer Hiromi Uehara stands at the threshold of limitless possibility." Jim Santella of All About Jazz commented "Her piano cascades drive with simple elegance, and she resolves every phrase with a dynamic spirit. She enthralls her audience with powerful rhythmic strides that challenge the intellect. Meters change, moods shift, and her driving force keeps on going. Her improvised romps come alive with foot-tapping and head-bobbing energy that keeps the listener buoyed from start to finish."

Track listing
 Spiral (10:40)
 Open Door - Tuning - Prologue (10:16)
 Déjà Vu (7:45)
 Reverse (5:09)
 Edge (5:19)
 Old Castle, by the River, in the Middle of the Forest (8:20)
 Love and Laughter (9:20)
 Return of the Kung-Fu World Champion (9:39)
 Big Chill (Japanese edition Bonus track) (7:30)

Personnel 
 Hiromi Uehara – piano
 Tony Grey – bass
 Martin Valihora – drums

References

External links
Disocgraphy at official site

2006 albums
Hiromi Uehara albums